Blue Brook flows into the Mohawk River near West Branch, New York.

References 

Rivers of Oneida County, New York
Mohawk River
Rivers of New York (state)